is a 1992 role-playing video game by Nihon Falcom. It is part of the Dragon Slayer series and the second entry in The Legend of Heroes subseries. The game first released for the NEC PC-8801 before being ported to the NEC PC-9801, FM Towns, PC Engine, Mega Drive, Super Famicom and MS-DOS.

Plot
The game is set some time after Prince Selios, the hero of the original game, has defeated the demon god Agunija. Iseruhasa is at peace. Selios has married Dina and she has given birth to Atlas. At the age of fifteen Atlas and his teacher Lowel spot strange beings in spacesuits outside of the capital city. They do not recognize the spacesuits and believe them to be monsters.

Release
The game was ported to different platforms: it was published by Hudson Soft for PC Engine on December 23, 1992; by Epoch Co. for Super Famicom on June 4, 1993; and by Sega for Mega Drive on January 20, 1995. A bundle containing updated versions of both The Legend of Heroes and The Legend of Heroes II was released by GMF in 1998 for PlayStation on June 25 and for Sega Saturn on September 23.
A Korean conversion of the original PC-9801 version was released for the MS-DOS/IBM PC by Mantra and Samsung in 1996.

Reception

Notes

References

Role-playing video games
DOS games
Dragon Slayer (series)
Japan-exclusive video games
NEC PC-8801 games
NEC PC-9801 games
FM Towns games
PlayStation (console) games
Sega Genesis games
Sega Saturn games
Super Nintendo Entertainment System games
TurboGrafx-CD games
Virtual Console games
The Legend of Heroes
1992 video games
Sega video games
Nihon Falcom games
Hudson Soft games
Epoch Co. games
Single-player video games
Video games developed in Japan